Edward Bausch (September 26, 1854 – July 30, 1941) was an American engineer and business executive, who served as president of Bausch & Lomb Optical Company from 1926 to 1935. He was awarded the twelfth ASME Medal in 1936. He served as chairman of the board until his death.

Bausch was born in Rochester, New York to John Jacob Bausch and Barbara (Zimmermann) Bausch. He obtained his engineering degree from Cornell University in 1874. He was a brother of Delta Kappa Epsilon. He spent his life-long career at the optical supply business Bausch & Lomb, where he was president from 1926 to 1935, and saw it “grow from an obscure spectacle shop to an industry of worldwide importance.” One of his early accomplishments in the late 19th century was the development and production of the company's first commercial microscope.

Selected publications 
 Edward Bausch. Manipulation of the microscope. Rochester, N.Y. : Bausch & Lomb optical company, 1891.

References 

1854 births
1941 deaths
Engineers from New York (state)
Cornell University College of Engineering alumni
Businesspeople from Rochester, New York
ASME Medal recipients